Fremont Memorial Hospital is a hospital in  Yuba City, California, United States.  It is part of the Fremont-Rideout Health Group.

References

External links
This hospital in the CA Healthcare Atlas A project by OSHPD

Hospitals in California
Buildings and structures in Sutter County, California
Yuba City, California